Rick Barton may refer to:

Rick Barton (diplomat) (born 1949), United States diplomat, educator and author
Rick Barton (musician), American guitarist and singer

See also
Richard Barton (disambiguation)